Colostethus jacobuspetersi, commonly known as the Quito rocket frog, is a species of frog in the family Dendrobatidae. It is endemic to Ecuador. Its natural habitats are subtropical or tropical moist montane forests, subtropical or tropical high-altitude grassland, and rivers. It is threatened by habitat loss.

References

jacobuspetersi
Amphibians of Ecuador
Amphibians of the Andes
Endemic fauna of Ecuador
Amphibians described in 1991
Taxonomy articles created by Polbot